Li Xiaokun (born February 1964) is a Chinese geneticist currently serving as president of Wenzhou Medical University.

Biography
Li was born in Fuping County, Shaanxi, in February 1964. He enrolled at Jilin University where he received his bachelor's degree in 1987 and his master's degree in 1992 both in medical science. Li received his doctor's degree from Sun Yat-sen University in 1996. After university, he joined the faculty of Jinan University. Li moved to Wenzhou in 2005. In July 2015 he was promoted to president of Wenzhou University, but having held the position for only two years. In April 2018 he was appointed president of Wenzhou Medical University, replacing Fan Lu.

Honours and awards
 November 22, 2019 Member of the Chinese Academy of Engineering (CAE)

References

1964 births
Living people
People from Fuping County, Shaanxi
Scientists from Shaanxi
Jilin University alumni
Sun Yat-sen University alumni
Presidents of Wenzhou Medical University
Presidents of Wenzhou University
Members of the Chinese Academy of Engineering